Aesthetic medicine is a branch of modern medicine that focuses on altering cosmetic appearance through the treatment of conditions including scars, skin laxity, wrinkles, moles, liver spots, excess fat, cellulite, unwanted hair, skin discoloration, and spider veins. Traditionally, it includes dermatology, oral and maxillofacial surgery, reconstructive surgery and plastic surgery, surgical procedures (liposuction, facelifts, breast implants, Radio frequency ablation), non-surgical procedures (radio frequency skin tightening, non- surgical liposuction, chemical peel, high-intensity focused electromagnetic field, radio frequency fat removal), and a combination of both. Aesthetic medicine procedures are usually elective. There is a long history of aesthetic medicine procedures, dating back to many notable cases in the 19th century, though techniques have developed much since then.

History of aesthetic medicine 

Throughout the history of society, physical beauty has been a consistently coveted notion.  Efforts to improve and enhance beauty through aesthetic medical practices can be seen as early as 2000 years ago, in India, where the 'forehead flap' was used to reconstruct the noses and faces of soldiers injured in war and criminal punishments. This technique, though thoroughly developed and modified, is still used today as a common method to repair nasal defects. Although Greek and Roman medical practices have been considered the foundation for European and modern-day medicine for a long time, ancient Egyptian texts have revealed that Egyptian medicine produced many key medical discoveries and the basis for many modern practices. The Egyptians recorded their use of oils, waxes, Cyperus, and other plant materials to reduce the signs of aging, like wrinkles and spots, and to restore youthful skin. They studied bodily functions, like inflammatory processes, and were able to make discoveries that allowed them to treat cosmetic wounds and burns using therapies and medicines. This included the initial application of fresh meat to the wound, followed by the use of oil/lipids, honey, and fibers, generally woven linen, until the wound had healed. As physicians have discovered more about medicine throughout history, these practices have been developed to be more efficient and sanitary, and can be seen today in common skin reparation remedies.

In more recent history, within the past 30 years, the industry of aesthetic medicine has been developing rapidly with the addition of and growing demand for "injectables," a form of transcutaneous treatment used to rejuvenate and restore the skin of a patient. These medical injectables have become well established due to their associated low risk, especially compared to other aesthetic surgical practices, as well as the practically non-existent recovery time needed after the procedures are performed. Within the past ten years, the U.S. Food and Drug Administration has reviewed and approved over 20 injectable products used for medical aesthetics, in response to the growing demand. The most commonly used injectables in the industry today are botulinum neurotoxin, commonly referred to as botox, and hyaluronic acid fillers. According to statistics from an annual survey conducted by the American Society for Aesthetic Plastic Surgery, from 1997 to 2011 the number of nonsurgical procedures performed by aesthetic physicians increased by 356%.

Statistics 

Worldwide, there were 20 million aesthetic procedures performed from 2014-2015.  Cosmetic surgery is a major driver of medical tourism. In February 2018 the president of the British Association of Aesthetic Plastic Surgeons said operations were performed on people who were not appropriate for surgery, and that unscrupulous practitioners have endangered their health for profit and that the cost of rectification for more than 1000 patients a year fell on the British National Health Service.
Countries that performed the most aesthetic procedures in 2014 were 
In the US, there were more than 11 million aesthetic procedures performed from 2012-2013, and 83.5% of the procedures were nonsurgical.
In the UK, there were 50,000 cosmetic surgery procedures performed in 2013-2014.
Surgical aesthetic procedures account for 10% of the cosmetic procedures in the UK, and non surgical techniques constitute the remaining 90%.
In the US, the top 5 surgical aesthetic procedures were 1) Liposuction 2) Breast augmentation 3) Blepharoplasty 4) Abdominoplasty 5) Rhinoplasty
In the US, the top 5 nonsurgical aesthetic procedures were 1) Botulinum Toxin 2) Hyaluronic acid 3) Laser hair removal 4) Microdermabrasion 5) Photorejuvenation
In South Korea, there were more than 980,000 aesthetic procedures performed from 2014-2015.
In South Korea, the top 5 surgical aesthetic procedures were 1) Blepharoplasty 2) Rhinoplasty 3) Fat Grafting 4) Rhytidectomy 5) Hair Transplantation

Indications 

Aesthetic medicine specializes in altering the cosmetic appearance.  It has diverse applications for dermatological and surgical conditions.  It includes indications related to minimizing signs of aging, such as skin laxity, wrinkles, and liver spots.  Aesthetic medicine also plays a role in the treatment of excess fat, cellulite, and obesity.  Laser based therapies can be indicated for the treatment of scars, unwanted hair, skin discoloration, and spider veins.

Overall health is assessed by a physician to ensure that the symptom being treated (for example, weight gain and excessive hair) is not a sign of an underlying medical condition (like hypothyroidism) that should be stabilized with medical therapies.
It is also very important for the medical aesthetician to be inclusive in providing a team approach for minimally invasive facial aesthetic procedures.

Techniques and procedures 

 Photorejuvenation
 Injections of Botulinum toxin (Botox)
 Injection of dermal fillers
 Cryolipolysis
 Chemical Peels
 Mesotherapy injection
 Cellulite treatment
 Nutrition
 Permanent makeup
 Hair transplantation
 Laser hair removal
 Laser Therapy for scars and stretch marks
 Nd:YAG laser for spider veins
 Contour threads
 Non-surgical liposuction
 Lipotomy
 Carboxytherapy
 Radio Frequency skin tightening
 laser tattoo removal
 facelifts
 Rhinoplasty 
 Abdominoplasty
 Breast augmentation or reduction
 Brachioplasty 
 Liposuction

Careers in aesthetic medicine 

A career in aesthetic medicine can be approached from a number of professions.  A multidisciplinary or team based approach is often necessary to adequately address an aesthetic need.  To perform certain procedures, one must be a surgeon, medical doctor (Dermatologist/plastic surgeon/ENT surgeon/Oculoplastic surgeon) or maxillofacial surgeon /Cosmetic Dentist.  However, many of the procedures are routinely performed by trained Medical Aestheticians or facial aesthetic nurse-aestheticians  nurses.  For example, Medical Aesthetician can perform progressive chemical peels.  Medical Aesthetics requires specialized training and certification beyond a nurse license / aesthetic license. Counselors, psychologists or psychiatrists can help people determine if their reasons for pursuing aesthetic procedures are healthy and help to identify psychiatric disorders such as compulsive eating, anorexia, and body dysmorphic disorder. Reconstructive surgeons can help correct appearance after accidents, burns, surgery for cancer (such as breast reconstruction after mastectomy for cancer), or for congenital deformities like correction of cleft lip. Orthodontists work to improve alignment of teeth, often partially for aesthetic reasons, and oral and maxillofacial surgeons can perform cosmetic facial surgery & correct deformities of the mouth and jaw.  Both orthodontists and maxillofacial surgeons can be assisted by dental technicians.

References 

Cosmetic surgery
Practice of medicine